was a Japanese waka poet of the early Heian period.

He was included in the Late Classical Thirty-Six Poetic Geniuses, and thirty-three of his poems were included in poetry collections commissioned by the court.

Biography 
His birth and death dates are unknown, and the details of his life are also uncertain, but he was the son of Ariwara no Muneyana (died 898), the first son of Ariwara no Narihira (825—880). Who his mother was is also unknown.

As a courtier, he held the Senior Fifth Rank, although the 14th century  attributes to him the Sixth Rank.

Poetry 
He was listed as one of the Late Classical Thirty-Six Poetic Geniuses. Thirty-three of his poems were included in court anthologies: fourteen the Kokin Wakashū, eight in the Gosen Wakashū, two in the Shūi Wakashū, and nine more in later anthologies from the Shin Kokin Wakashū on.

The following poem was included as the very first entry in the Kokin Wakashū, indicating the high regard in which the compilers likely held his poetry.

Some of these overlap with the Motokata poems preserved in court anthologies.

Characteristic style 
His poems are characterized by an intellectual style.

His poems clearly display the features of the so-called "Kokinshū style".

Family tree

References

Bibliography

External links 
List of Narihira's poems in the International Research Center for Japanese Studies's online waka database.
Ariwara no Motokata on Kotobank.

People of Heian-period Japan
Ariwara clan
Japanese nobility
Japanese poets
Articles containing Japanese poems